Arantxa Isabel Álvarez Garri (born 17 November 1991) is a Swedish television presenter and singer. She grew up in Norrköping and is since 2014 residing in Malmö.

Career 
Alvarez participated in Idol 2013 broadcast on TV4 and made it to the Top 20. She was then eliminated during the Semi Final Qualifyings. During the summer of 2014 she made her debut as a television presenter for the Sveriges Radio show Morgonpasset. And in the aid show Musikhjälpen broadcast both on Sveriges Television and Sveriges Radio she was that years "public ambassador".

In the summer of 2015 she was again presenter of Morgonpasset in Sveriges Radio P3, and during late 2015 she presented Idol Extra which was broadcast on TV4, she presented the show along with singer Erik Segerstedt. In the summer of 2016 she again got to present her third summer of Morgonpasset, this time along with Farah Abadi, Victor Linnér, Jonatan Unge och Simon Rosenqvist. In 2016, she will also present the children's show Morgonshowen on Barnkanalen. As well as being a reviewer of comical videos for the Swedish version of Ridiculousness which premiered on MTV in August 2016.

In 2021, she became a co-presenter of Big Brother which is broadcast on Sjuan.

References

External links 
 

Living people
1991 births
Swedish television hosts
Swedish women television presenters
People from Norrköping